The 402nd Support Brigade is a support brigade of the United States Army.

External links
402nd Support Brigade at the Institute of Heraldry

Support 402